St Botolph's Church, Shepshed is the Church of England Parish Church in Shepshed, Leicestershire.

Background
It is the most westerly church dedicated to St Botolph and was founded in the 11th century. It is a Grade I listed building.

The church sits on top of the highest point in Shepshed, probably on the site of an ancient pre-Christian site of worship.  The oldest surviving part of the church, the west tower and spire, dates from the 13th century.  The nave, with clerestory and aisles, and chancel are all 15th-century.  It is constructed mainly from Charnwood granite with Swithland slate roofing.

The south transept with vestry by Albert Herbert. The pulpit is by R. Norman Shaw.

Bells 
The church has a ring of bells for bell ringing. The present set of bells were all cast in 1948 at the nearby Taylor's Bell Foundry in Loughborough.

Organ
The church has a two manual pipe organ by Henry Willis, located in an organ loft to the east of the nave. A specification of the organ can be found on the National Pipe Organ Register

References

External links 
 Listed buildings in Shepshed
 details of bells

Church of England church buildings in Leicestershire
Grade I listed churches in Leicestershire
Anglo-Catholic church buildings in Leicestershire
St Botolph's Church